Major-General Anthony Peter Grant Peterkin  (born 6 July 1947) is a retired senior British Army officer. He was the British House of Commons' Serjeant at Arms between 2004 and 2007.

Early life
Grant Peterkin was born on 6 July 1947. He is the son of the late Brigadier James Grant Peterkin, DSO and his wife Dorothea Grant Peterkin. He was educated at Ampleforth College, then an all-boys private school in Ampleforth, North Yorkshire.

Military career
Having graduated from the Royal Military Academy Sandhurst, Grant Peterkin was commissioned into the Queen's Own Highlanders on 28 July 1967 as a second lieutenant. He was given the service number 483916. In 1968, he was selected for an in-service degree and began studying history at Durham University. He was promoted to lieutenant on 28 January 1969. He graduated from Durham with a Bachelor of Arts (BA) in 1971. He was a member of Hatfield College during his studies. He was promoted to captain on 28 July 1973. Between 1973 and 1974, he served as aide-de-camp to the Chief of the General Staff, then General Sir Peter Hunt. He was promoted to major on 31 December 1979, and then attended the Indian Staff College in 1980. Following this experience he rejoined the 1st Battalion of the Queen's Own Highlanders in Hong Kong and later took them to the Falkland Islands in the aftermath of the Falklands War.

After a posting at the Ministry of Defence he attended the Australian Joint Services Staff College in 1986, and was promoted to lieutenant colonel on 31 December 1986 with seniority in that rank from 30 June 1986. He was appointed commanding officer of 1st Battalion, Queen's Own Highlanders in 1987. Then, from 1989 to 1991, he was Military Assistant to the Military Secretary. In the aftermath of the Gulf War he joined the United Nations Iraq–Kuwait Observation Mission, heading the British contingent of border observers. He was appointed Commander 24th Airmobile Brigade in 1993 and then became Deputy Military Secretary in 1996.

In 1999 he went on a mission, arranged by the Organization for Security and Co-operation in Europe, to Kosovo and then later that year he was appointed the senior Army representative at the Royal College of Defence Studies. In October 1999 he became General Officer Commanding 5th Division. He became Military Secretary in 2000 before retiring in 2004.

Later life
He was appointed Serjeant at Arms in 2004. His contract was not renewed in 2007 after suggestions of a falling out with Michael Martin, the Speaker of the House of Commons.

Personal life
In 1974, Grant Peterkin married Joanna Young, daughter of Sir Brian Young. Together, they have had two children; one son and one daughter.

Honours and decorations
In the 1991 New Year Honours, Grant Peterkin was appointed Officer of the Order of the British Empire (OBE). In the 2003 New Year Honours, he was appointed Companion of the Order of the Bath (CB).

References

|-
 

|-

1947 births
Living people
Serjeants-at-Arms of the British House of Commons
British Army major generals
People educated at Ampleforth College
Alumni of Hatfield College, Durham
Queen's Own Highlanders officers
Graduates of the Royal Military Academy Sandhurst
Companions of the Order of the Bath
Officers of the Order of the British Empire